The 2021 Dallas Wings season was the franchise's 24th season in the Women's National Basketball Association (WNBA) and the 6th season for the franchise in Dallas. This was the first season under new head coach Vickie Johnson, after she was hired on December 9, 2020.

The Wings had the #1 and #2 picks in the 2021 WNBA Draft. They selected Charli Collier and Awak Kuier, while also adding top talents in Chelsea Dungee and Dana Evans.

The Wings won their first game of the season, but couldn't keep the momentum going as they lost their next four games in a row, to finish May with a 1–4 record.  The team improved during the month of June, posting a 7–5 overall record including wins at Seattle and a two-game sweep of Phoenix.  The team faltered in July going 1–3 including three straight losses heading into the Olympic break.  At the Olympic break their record was 9–12.  After the break, they alternated loss and wins to post a 2–3 record in August.  They finished out the regular season 3–3 in September, and secured a playoff berth after a win on September 11 vs. the New York Liberty.  Their overall record of 14–18 earned the seventh seed in the 2021 WNBA Playoffs.

In the first round of the playoffs, they faced off against the Chicago Sky.  The Sky dominated the game from the outset and the Wings outscored the Sky in only one quarter of the game.  The Wings lost 64–81 to end their season.

Transactions

WNBA Draft

Trades and Roster changes

Roster

Game Log

Preseason 

|- style="background:#fcc;"
| 1
| May 8
| Connecticut
| L 76–89
| Allisha Gray (19)
| Charli Collier (10)
| Moriah Jefferson (4)
| College Park Center
| 0–1
|-
| 2
| May 11
| @ New York
| colspan=4 | Scrimmage
| Barclays Center
| 0–0

Regular season 

|- style="background:#bbffbb;"
| 1
| May 14
| @ Los Angeles
| W 94–71
| Allisha Gray (23)
| Kayla Thornton (11)
| Tyasha Harris (7)
| Los Angeles Convention CenterNo Fans
| 1–0
|- style="background:#fcc;"
| 2
| May 22
| Seattle
| 97–100 (OT)
| Arike Ogunbowale (28)
| Kayla Thornton (12)
| Arike Ogunbowale (6)
| College Park Center1,491
| 1–1
|- style="background:#fcc;"
| 3
| May 24
| @ New York
| L 81–88
| Arike Ogunbowale (24)
| Kayla Thornton (11)
| Tyasha Harris (7)
| Barclays Center894
| 1–2
|- style="background:#fcc;"
| 4
| May 27
| @ Atlanta
| L 95–101
| MabreyOgunbowale (24)
| Isabelle Harrison (9)
| Moriah Jefferson (4)
| Gateway Center Arena711
| 1–3
|- style="background:#fcc;"
| 5
| May 29
| Phoenix
| L 85–89
| MabreyOgunbowale (24)
| Marina Mabrey (8)
| Isabelle Harrison (3)
| College Park Center1,717
| 1–4

|- style="background:#bbffbb;"
| 6
| June 1
| Los Angeles
| W 69–79
| Tyasha Harris (18)
| CollierMabreyThornton (7)
| JeffersonMabrey (6)
| College Park Center1,372
| 2–4
|- style="background:#fcc;"
| 7
| June 4
| @ Seattle
| L 102–105 (OT)
| Marina Mabrey (24)
| Satou Sabally (9)
| Arike Ogunbowale (8)
| Angel of the Winds Arena1,467
| 2–5
|- style="background:#bbffbb;"
| 8
| June 6
| @ Seattle
| W 68–67
| Arike Ogunbowale (24)
| Isabelle Harrison (8)
| Arike Ogunbowale (3)
| Angel of the Winds Arena1,930
| 3–5
|- style="background:#bbffbb;"
| 9
| June 9
| @ Phoenix
| W 85–81
| Arike Ogunbowale (22)
| Isabelle Harrison (9)
| Tyasha Harris (7)
| Phoenix Suns Arena3,618
| 4–5
|- style="background:#bbffbb;"
| 10
| June 11
| @ Phoenix
| W 77–59
| Arike Ogunbowale (20)
| Bella Alarie (9)
| HarrisSabally (4)
| Phoenix Suns Arena4,261
| 5–5
|- style="background:#fcc;"
| 11
| June 13
| @ Las Vegas
| L 78–85
| Satou Sabally (24)
| Isabelle Harrison (9)
| Arike Ogunbowale (8)
| Michelob Ultra ArenaNo Fans
| 5–6
|- style="background:#fcc;"
| 12
| June 17
| Minnesota
| L 73–85
| Arike Ogunbowale (20)
| Bella Alarie (6)
| Moriah Jefferson (4)
| College Park Center1,519
| 5–7
|- style="background:#bbffbb;"
| 13
| June 19
| Minnesota
| W 95–77
| Marina Mabrey (28)
| Bella Alarie (8)
| Arike Ogunbowale (6)
| College Park Center1,751
| 6–7
|- style="background:#fcc;"
| 14
| June 22
| @ Connecticut
| L 70–80
| Arike Ogunbowale (18)
| Marina Mabrey (5)
| Arike Ogunbowale (5)
| Mohegan Sun Arena2,076
| 6–8
|- style="background:#bbffbb;"
| 15
| June 24
| @ Indiana
| W 89–64
| Satou Sabally (15)
| Satou Sabally (9)
| Arike Ogunbowale (5)
| Indiana Farmers ColiseumNo Fans
| 7–8
|- style="background:#bbffbb;"
| 16
| June 26
| Washington
| W 85–74
| Arike Ogunbowale (30)
| SaballyThornton (8)
| Satou Sabally (5)
| College Park Center2,055
| 8–8
|- style="background:#fcc;"
| 17
| June 30
| Chicago
| L 81–91
| Isabelle Harrison (23)
| Isabelle Harrison (8)
| MabreyOgunbowale (4)
| College Park Center1,778
| 8–9

|- style="background:#bbffbb;"
| 18
| July 2
| Chicago
| W 100–91
| Marina Mabrey (28)
| Satou Sabally (9)
| Satou Sabally (6)
| College Park Center2,187
| 9–9
|- style="background:#fcc;"
| 19
| July 5
| @ New York
| L 96–99
| Isabelle Harrison (23)
| HarrisonMabreySabally (7)
| Moriah Jefferson (6)
| Barclays Center1,677
| 9–10
|- style="background:#fcc;"
| 20
| July 7
| @ Minnesota
| L 79–85
| Allisha Gray (13)
| Satou Sabally (6)
| Satou Sabally (7)
| Target Center2,321
| 9–11
|- style="background:#fcc;"
| 21
| July 11
| Las Vegas
| L 79–95
| GrayJefferson (14)
| Satou Sabally (9)
| HarrisHarrisonOgunbowaleSabally (3)
| College Park Center2,533
| 9–12

|- style="background:#fcc;"
| 22
| August 15
| Connecticut
| L 59–80
| Arike Ogunbowale (20)
| Isabelle Harrison (5)
| Arike Ogunbowale (5)
| College Park Center2,399
| 9–13
|- style="background:#bbffbb;"
| 23
| August 17
| @ Chicago
| W 80–76
| Allisha Gray (20)
| Kayla Thornton (10)
| Moriah Jefferson (8)
| Wintrust Arena3,902
| 10–13
|- style="background:#fcc;"
| 24
| August 20
| Indiana
| L 81–83
| Isabelle Harrison (22)
| Isabelle Harrison (7)
| Arike Ogunbowale (6)
| College Park Center2,017
| 10–14
|- style="background:#bbffbb;"
| 25
| August 26
| @ Washington
| W 82–77
| Arike Ogunbowale (26)
| Isabelle Harrison (10)
| Arike Ogunbowale (9)
| Entertainment and Sports Arena2,465
| 11–14
|- style="background:#fcc;"
| 26
| August 28
| @ Washington Mystics
| L 75–76
| Arike Ogunbowale (25)
| Isabelle Harrison (9)
| Marina Mabrey (5)
| Entertainment and Sports Arena2,410
| 11–15

|- style="background:#bbffbb;"
| 27
| September 2
| Atlanta
| W 72–68
| Allisha Gray (19)
| GrayHarrison (10)
| Moriah Jefferson (6)
| College Park Center1,975
| 12–15
|- style="background:#fcc;"
| 28
| September 5
| Atlanta
| L 64–69
| Arike Ogunbowale (21)
| Allisha Gray (14)
| Tyasha Harris (6)
| College Park Center2,386
| 12–16
|- style="background:#fcc;"
| 29
| September 7
| Connecticut
| L 56–83
| Marina Mabrey (16)
| Awak Kuier (8)
| AlarieHarrisKuierOgunbowale (2)
| College Park Center1,945
| 12–17
|- style="background:#bbffbb;"
| 30
| September 11
| New York
| W 77–76
| Marina Mabrey (21)
| Allisha Gray (11)
| Marina Mabrey (6)
| College Park Center2,888
| 13–17
|- style="background:#fcc;"
| 31
| September 13
| @ Las Vegas
| L 75–85
| Arike Ogunbowale (23)
| CollierOgunbowale (8)
| Marina Mabrey (7)
| Michelob Ultra ArenaN/A
| 13–18
|- style="background:#bbffbb;"
| 32
| September 19
| Los Angeles
| W 87–84
| Arike Ogunbowale (20)
| Allisha Gray (7)
| Marina Mabrey (5)
| College Park Center3,604
| 14–18

Playoffs 

|- style="background:#fcc;"
| 1
| September 23
| @ Chicago
| 64–81
| Arike Ogunbowale (22)
| Isabelle Harrison (10)
| Moriah Jefferson (4)
| Wintrust Arena4,672
| 0–1

Standings

Playoffs

Statistics

Regular Season
Source:

Awards and honors

References

External links 
 Official website of the Dallas Wings

Dallas Wings
Dallas Wings seasons
Dallas Wings